The Samsung Galaxy J2 Core is a smartphone manufactured by Samsung Electronics. It was released in August 2018 with its operating system Android 8.1.0 "Oreo". It is the first Android Go based phone by Samsung.

Specifications

Hardware 
The J2 Core is equipped with a 5.0 inch IPS 540 × 960 qHD display. It is powered by an Exynos 7570 SoC including a quad-core ARM Cortex-A53 CPU with 1.4 GHz, an ARM Mali-T720 GPU with 1 GB RAM and either 8 or 16 GB internal storage. It is available in Black, Gold and Lavender. A slightly refreshed version was announced in April 2020 with no 8 GB option and a new Blue color replacing Lavender.

Software 
The J2 Core ships with Android 8.1.0 "Oreo" and Samsung's Experience UI. It's a special version named Go edition which is developed for low-end smartphones.

See also 

 Samsung Galaxy
 Samsung Galaxy J series
 Samsung Galaxy J3 (2018)
 Samsung Galaxy J4 Core
 Samsung Galaxy J6
 Samsung Galaxy J6+
 Samsung Galaxy J4+
 Samsung Galaxy J8

References

External links 

Galaxy Core
Samsung smartphones
Android (operating system) devices
Mobile phones introduced in 2018
Discontinued smartphones
Mobile phones with user-replaceable battery